California's 41st district may refer to:

 California's 41st congressional district
 California's 41st State Assembly district